This is a list of the National Register of Historic Places listings in Carbon County, Wyoming.

It is intended to be a complete list of the properties and districts on the National Register of Historic Places in Carbon County, Wyoming, United States. The locations of National Register properties and districts for which the latitude and longitude coordinates are included below, may be seen in a map.

There are 49 properties and districts listed on the National Register in the county, 1 of which is a National Historic Landmark.

Current listings

|}

See also 

 List of National Historic Landmarks in Wyoming
 National Register of Historic Places listings in Wyoming

References 

Carbon